The Lander, Parkin, and Selfridge conjecture concerns the integer solutions of equations which contain sums of like powers.  The equations are generalisations of those considered in Fermat's Last Theorem. The conjecture is that if the sum of some k-th powers equals the sum of some other k-th powers, then the total number of terms in both sums combined must be at least k.

Background 
Diophantine equations, such as the integer version of the equation a2 + b2 = c2 that appears in the Pythagorean theorem, have been studied for their integer solution properties for centuries. Fermat's Last Theorem states that for powers greater than 2, the equation ak + bk = ck has no solutions in non-zero integers  a, b, c. Extending the number of terms on either or both sides, and allowing for higher powers than 2, led to Leonhard Euler to propose in 1769 that for all integers n and k greater than 1, if the sum of n kth powers of positive integers is itself a kth power, then n is greater than or equal to k.

In symbols, if

In 1966, a counterexample to Euler's sum of powers conjecture was found by Leon J. Lander and Thomas R. Parkin for k = 5:
275 + 845 + 1105 + 1335 = 1445.

In subsequent years, further counterexamples were found, including for k = 4. The latter disproved the more specific Euler quartic conjecture, namely that a4 + b4 + c4 = d4 has no positive integer solutions.  In fact, the smallest solution, found in 1988, is

4145604 + 2175194 + 958004 = 4224814.

Conjecture 

In 1967, L. J. Lander, T. R. Parkin, and John Selfridge conjectured that if , where ai ≠ bj are positive integers for all 1 ≤ i ≤ n and 1 ≤ j ≤ m, then m+n ≥ k. The equal sum of like powers formula is often abbreviated as (k, m, n).

The conjecture implies in the special case of m = 1 that if 

(under the conditions given above) then n ≥ k − 1.

For this special case of m = 1, some of the known solutions satisfying the proposed constraint with  n ≤ k, where terms are positive integers, hence giving a partition of a power into like powers, are:

k = 3
33 + 43 + 53 = 63.

k = 4
958004 + 2175194 + 4145604 = 4224814,  (Roger Frye, 1988)

304 + 1204 + 2724 + 3154 = 3534, (R. Norrie, 1911)
Fermat's Last Theorem states that for k = 4 the conjecture is true.

k = 5
275 + 845 + 1105 + 1335 = 1445,  (Lander, Parkin, 1966)

75 + 435 + 575 + 805 + 1005 = 1075, (Sastry, 1934, third smallest)

k = 6
(None known. As of 2002, there are no solutions whose final term is ≤ 730000. )

k = 7
1277 + 2587 + 2667 + 4137 + 4307 + 4397 + 5257 = 5687,  (M. Dodrill, 1999)

k = 8
908 + 2238 + 4788 + 5248 + 7488 + 10888 + 11908 + 13248 = 14098,  (Scott Chase, 2000)

k ≥ 9
(None known.)

Current status
It is not known if the conjecture is true, or if nontrivial solutions exist that would be counterexamples, such as ak + bk = ck + dk for k ≥ 5.

Trivial solutions include certain cases with composite exponents k, e.g. k = 6, as for such k = p * q it is possible to have solutions (ap)q + (bp)q = (aq)p + (bq)p, for positive integers a and b.

See also
Beal's conjecture
Fermat–Catalan conjecture
Jacobi–Madden equation
List of unsolved problems in mathematics
Experimental mathematics (counterexamples to Euler's sum of powers conjecture, especially smallest solution for k = 4)
Prouhet–Tarry–Escott problem
Pythagorean quadruple
Sums of powers, a list of related conjectures and theorems

References

External links 
 EulerNet: Computing Minimal Equal Sums Of Like Powers
 Jaroslaw Wroblewski  Equal Sums of Like Powers
 Tito Piezas III:  A Collection of Algebraic Identities
 
 
 
 
 
 
 
 Euler's Conjecture at library.thinkquest.org
 A simple explanation of Euler's Conjecture at Maths Is Good For You!
 Mathematicians Find New Solutions To An Ancient Puzzle
 Ed Pegg Jr. Power Sums, Math Games

Diophantine equations
Conjectures
Unsolved problems in number theory